Nicolas Panagopoulos is a Greek composer of contemporary music. Born in Athens in 1954, he studied piano and music theory at the National Conservatory of Athens. He continued his studies with a scholarship from the French government at the National Superior Conservatory of Paris for Music and Dance (CNSMDP).

Studies 

He studied music analysis with Betsy Jolas (1973–1975), electroacoustic music with Pierre Schaeffer (1975–1978) and composition with Olivier Messiaen (1974–1978).

He received a first place award for composition unanimously by the jury.

Additional studies 

 Acoustic courses in the laboratory of E. Leip at the University of Jussieu Paris VI
 Seminars on "Image and Sound" at the École Normale of Paris
 Practical training in composition and computer music at IRCAM (Institute de recherche et coordination acoustique/musique)
 Orchestral conducting at the Conservatoire de Strasbourg with Jean-Sébastien Béreau

Music

In 1979, subsidized by the French Ministry of Culture, Panagopoulos conducted research on new music notation and dealt with the potential relations between vision and hearing, a method adapted on his compositions.

One of his most significant works is Five Seasons (Cinq saisons, 1981–1982), an assignment of IRCAM for the Metz Festival in France in 1982. The work was written for seven wind instruments, three percussion, and tape. The graphic score is presented on millimetre paper, using different colors corresponding to the different timbres of the orchestra.

In 1982, in a Greek national competition of composition and artistic music he received a distinction award for his work "Sans titre" ("Untitled"), by the Greek Minister of Culture, Melina Mercouri.

Many of his most significant works have been played at festivals and broadcast throughout Greece and abroad.

Since 1988 Panagopoulos lives in Greece, where he devotes his time to composition and music education.

Works

Vocal 
"38th Parallel", based on a poem of Antonis Zaharopoulos, for bass voice and tuba (1973), Radio France
"Metabole" for English horn, clavichord, and soprano (1985)

Mixed media 
"Voyage 2" for tuba and tape (1978) Studio 105, Radio France, soloist: Gérard Buquet
"Voyage 3" for clarinet, horn, bassoon and tape (1979)
"White Nights", music theatre for harp and small ensemble (1979)
Five Seasons for 7 woodwinds, 3 percussions and tape (1981–1982). Inspired by the work of the Swiss painter , Mutation of a Landscape; Festival International de Musique Contemporain, Ensemble Ιntercontemporain, conducted by Peter Eötvös
"Newsepia" for flute trombone, violoncello, piano and tape (1989)

Orchestral 
"Reflections" for two orchestras (1974)
"Concerto for orchestra" (1978) conducted by Pierre Stoll same year in Paris
1985 Athens Festival, Lycabettus and Corfu Festival, conducted by Georgi Notev, Pleven Philharmonic Orchestra

Chamber music 
"String Quartet", Studio 105, Radio France
"Tomi" for 2 flutes, clarinet, trumpet, trombone, tuba, violin, violoncello, and piano (1972) Paris, conducted by Pierre Boulez
"Untitled" for twelve strings (1980, Festival d'Avignon: Cannes Orchestra, conducted by Michel Decoust
"Trio" for violin, piano, cello (1984)
"Pentalogue" for five soloists (1986)
"Plot" for two flutes (1987)
"Sepia" for wind quartet, string quartet and piano (1988)
"Despite myself" for flute, bassoon, horn, piano and percussions (1993–94), The Athens Concert Hall, conducted by Theodoros Antoniou

Piano 
"Sonata" (1970)
"Ten Icons" (1988) "Parnassos" Concert Hall, piano: Aris Garoufalis

Electronic music 
"Etude" for tape (1975) Château de Langeais Festival
"Voyage 1" for tape (1976) Patras Festival (1987)
"Diabolus in musica" for ten synthesizers and computer (1987)
"Overdose" digital composition (2001)

Choral 
"Retort" for mixed chorus and orchestra (1983)
"Dance of Shadows" for SATB, without text a cappella, Mediterranean Music Conference, Palermo (1992)
"Ulysses' Lament" for mixed chorus and orchestra (2005)

References 

 Messiaen 2008 : Messiaen au Conservatoire : contributions du Conservatoire national supérieur de musique et de danse de Paris aux célébrations de la naissance d'Olivier Messiaen 
 Encyclopedia of World Music, Publications Alkyon 
 International dictionary of music: Olympia Tolika Publications: European centre of Art 
 Dictionary of Greek Composers Publications: Fillipos Nakas 
 Dictionary of Greek music, Takis kalogeropoulos, Publications: Giallelis 
Le Tuba contemporain : Nouvelles techniques de jeu appliquées au tuba Gérard Buquet Publications: Ambrioso

External links 
 

1954 births
Living people
20th-century classical composers
Greek classical composers
Musicians from Athens